The Latta Arcade is an indoor shopping arcade located at 320 S. Tryon St. in Charlotte, Mecklenburg County, North Carolina.  It was built in 1914 to include a two floor atrium with stores and restaurants.  There is a glass skylight over the atrium, which was originally used to allow natural light for grading cotton.   It was designed by architect William H. Peeps.

It was listed on the National Register of Historic Places in 1975.

Gallery

References

External links 

Commercial buildings on the National Register of Historic Places in North Carolina
Commercial buildings completed in 1914
Buildings and structures in Charlotte, North Carolina
National Register of Historic Places in Mecklenburg County, North Carolina